Rywung is a locality in the Western Downs Region, Queensland, Australia.

Rywung's postcode is 4413.

Geography 
The Warrego Highway and Western railway line are the northern boundary of the locality. The Rywung railway station serves the locality.

History 
Unity Provisional School opened on 16 November 1922 and closed in 1931. It was on the south-western corner of Lees Road and B Kerrs Road on the present-day boundary between Goombi and Rywung.

Rywung State School opened on 1 November 1944 and closed on 31 December 1968. It was located on C Kerrs Road near the Warrego Highway north of the Rywung railway station. Being north of the Warrego Highway means the school's location is now within the neighbouring locality of Cameby.

In the  Rywung had a population of 27 people.

References 

Western Downs Region
Localities in Queensland